"Moonfesta" (stylized in Japanese as "moonfesta～ムーンフェスタ～") is a song recorded by Japanese trio Kalafina. The title track was used as theme song for the TV show Minna no Uta. It was the group's second single from their fourth studio album Consolation. The song was written by Yuki Kajiura, who also composed and produced the single, which she has done for the group since their debut. It was released in three versions: a limited CD+DVD edition (Type-A), a limited CD+Blu-ray edition (Type-B), and a regular CD only edition.

Track list
Digital download single/CD single
"moonfesta" – 4:28
"" – 4:29
"moonfesta" (instrumental) – 4:27

Limited edition CD track list
"moonfesta" – 4:28
"" – 4:29
"moonfesta" (Minna no Uta version) – 2:24
"moonfesta" (Minna no Uta version) (instrumental) – 4:27

Limited edition Type-A bonus DVD
"moonfesta" (music video)

Limited edition Type-B bonus DVD
"moonfesta" (music video)
"moonfesta" (Minna no Uta version)

Personnel
Yuki Kajiura – arrangement
Furukawa Masayoshi – acoustic guitar
Nozaki Masuke – drums
Takahashi "Jr" Tomoharu – bass
Misawa Mataro – percussion
Konno Hitoshi – strings

References

2012 singles
2012 songs
Songs written by Yuki Kajiura
SME Records singles